Childowla, New South Wales is a civil parish of Buccleuch County, New South Wales.

The only town of the parish is Burrinjuck village on the Murrumbidgee River.

References

Localities in New South Wales
Geography of New South Wales
Parishes of Buccleuch County
Yass Valley Council